Cómplices Al Rescate: El Gran Final is the third soundtrack for the Mexican television series Cómplices Al Rescate (Friends to the Rescue). It was released in Mexico by Ariola Records, a subsidiary of BMG.

Information 
The CD contains the music from the series performed for the cast, including Daniela Luján, Martín Ricca, Fabián Chávez and the "Cómplices": Alex Speitzer, Ramiro Torres, Vadhir Derbez, Martha Sabrina, Dulce María López and Diego Amozurrutia.

Track listing

Charts

See also 
 Cómplices Al Rescate: Silvana
 Cómplices Al Rescate: Mariana

References 

Television soundtracks
2002 soundtrack albums